Cornelia Lister and Renata Voráčová were the defending champions, but they chose not to participate.

Arantxa Rus and Tamara Zidanšek won the title, defeating first-time finalists Elisabetta Cocciaretto and Martina Trevisan in the final, 7–5, 7–5.

Seeds

Draw

Draw

References

External links
 Main draw

Internazionali Femminili di Palermo - Doubles
2020 Doubles